Archibald George "Bill" Hardie (19 December 1908 – 28 February 1997) was Archdeacon of West Cumberland from 1971 until 1979.

The son of the Most Rev. William George Hardie (Archbishop of the West Indies from 1945 to 1949), he was educated at St. Lawrence College, Ramsgate; Trinity College, Cambridge and Westcott House, Cambridge; and ordained in 1935. After a curacy at All Hallows, Lombard Street he was Chaplain at Repton School from 1936 to 1938; Vicar of St Alban, Golders Green from 1938 to 1944; Rector of Hexham Abbey from  1944 to 63; and Vicar and Rural Dean of Halifax from  1963 until 1971.

References

1908 births
People educated at St Lawrence College, Ramsgate
Alumni of Trinity College, Cambridge
Alumni of Westcott House, Cambridge
Archdeacons of West Cumberland
1997 deaths